Genoplesium fimbriatum, commonly known as the fringed midge orchid is a small terrestrial orchid found from southern Queensland to southern New South Wales. It has a single thin leaf and up to thirty green to brownish-green flowers with red stripes and a red-tipped labellum with hairy edges.

Description
As with others in the genus, the flowers are inverted so that the labellum is above the column rather than below it. The labellum quivers in the slightest breeze. Flowering occurs between December and May.<ref name="RBGS">{{cite web|last1=Jones|first1=David|title=Genoplesium fimbriatum|url=http://plantnet.rbgsyd.nsw.gov.au/cgi-bin/NSWfl.pl?page=nswfl&lvl=sp&name=Genoplesium~fimbriatum|publisher=Royal Botanic Garden Sydney|accessdate=11 December 2017}}</ref>

Taxonomy and naming
The fringed leek orchid was first formally described in 1810 by Robert Brown who gave it the name Prasophyllum fimbriatum and published the description in Prodromus Florae Novae Hollandiae et Insulae Van Diemen. In 1989, David Jones and Mark Clements changed the name to Genoplesium fimbriatum and in 2002 changed the name again to Corunastylis fimbriata but the latter change has not been accepted by the World Checklist of Selected Plant Families. The specific epithet (fimbriatum) is a Latin word meaning "fringed" or "fibrous".

Distribution and habitatGenoplesium fimbriatum'' grows in a range of habitats including open forest, heath and moss gardens. It is found in near-coastal areas and nearby tablelands between Stanthorpe and Vincentia. It often occurs in areas with frequent wildfires and a relatively high rainfall.

References

External links
 
 

fimbriatum
Endemic orchids of Australia
Orchids of New South Wales
Orchids of Queensland
Plants described in 1810